= Catherine Locandro =

French writer (born 1973)

Catherine Locandro (born 1973) is a French writer. She was born in Nice and lives in Brussels. Her first novel Clara la nuit (2005) received the René Fallet Prize. Other works include Les Anges déçus (2007), Face au Pacifique (2009), L'Enfant de Calabre (2013), The Story of a Love (2014, about the singer Dalida) and Pour que rien ne s'efface (2017).
